Mark Kennedy (born 24 May 1972) is a former Australian rules footballer who played with St Kilda in the Australian Football League (AFL).

Kennedy was selected by St Kilda with pick 19 in the 1995 Pre-Season Draft, from Woodville-West Torrens. A defender, he played eight league games for St Kilda, all in the 1995 AFL season.

References

External links
 
 

1972 births
Australian rules footballers from South Australia
St Kilda Football Club players
Woodville-West Torrens Football Club players
Living people